Arthur C. Krause was an American football player and coach. He served as the head football coach at Western State College of Colorado—now known as Western Colorado University—in Gunnison, Colorado from 1922 to 1924, compiling a record of 5–10–1.

Krause played collegiately at Indiana University and spent one season with the professional Pine Village Athletic Club.

References

Year of birth missing
Year of death missing
American football ends
Indiana Hoosiers football players
Western Colorado Mountaineers football coaches
Western Colorado Mountaineers men's basketball coaches
High school football coaches in Colorado